Rachel Zimmerman Brachman (born Zimmerman; 1972) is a Canadian-born space scientist and inventor. She invented the "Blissymbol Printer" in 1984, making it simple for users with physical disabilities to communicate.  A user can choose various Blissymbols to convey his or her thoughts and the printer translates those images to written text.  Her invention was recognized worldwide and she has received several awards for her achievements.

Blissymbols were invented by Charles Bliss in the 1940s; however, it was only until the mid-1960s when people with disabilities started using Blissymbols to communicate, and it only became accessible until the 1980s. Blissymbols were traditionally used by having people pointing to a symbol that conveys what they are trying to say and then an assistant would translate. It was Brachman's invention the Blissymbol Printer that made it simpler for non-verbal people, such as those with severe physical disabilities like cerebral palsy, to communicate. The Blissymbol Printer allows people to choose various Blissymbols to convey his or her thoughts and the printer would translate those images into written text.

Life 
She was born Rachel Zimmerman in London, Ontario. From a young age she showed great interest in art, debate, music and especially science. As a 12 year old student at St. George's public school, Zimmerman Brachman developed a software program using Blissymbols. Zimmerman Brachman's original science project idea lead to her winning a silver-medal at the Canada-Wide Science Fair (1985) and it was showcased in Bulgaria at a world exhibition of young inventors, and she also received YTV Achievement Award. She studied and graduated from London Central Secondary School. Zimmerman went on to earn a BA in physics from Brandeis University in 1995. During her time at Brandeis, she co-founded the Women in Science Club. Then, she completed a master's degree in Space Science from the International Space University in France in 1998. Zimmerman attempted to earn a master's degree in astronomy from the University of Western Ontario, but two months into the program she was hit by a car while riding her bike and forced to drop out of the program.  With her interest in space technology and assistive intelligence, Brachman now works at NASA Jet Propulsion Laboratory with a goal of tailoring NASA innovations to the needs of people with disabilities.

Scientific career 

In 1984, Rachel Zimmerman at age 12, invented a device called the Blissymbol printer, which used a unique software program to translate Blissymbols tapped on a board into clear written language on a computer, which allow the disabled to easily communicate with others. Brachman originally developed a software program using Blissymbols for her sixth-grade school science fair project. She took the already existing Blissymbols system of pointing to the symbol and added a touch-sensitive Atari tablet into a Blissymbol touchpad. She also added a printer that allows people to print out what they wrote. This made it easier for people to communicate independently. Additionally, instead of using an assistant to translate the symbols, people could just simply push the symbol and the Blissymbol Printer would translate it into written word on a computer screen. Now, the system could be used in other languages, including French. Voice output has also been added. It is still used in Canada, Sweden, Israel, and the United Kingdom.

Her "Blissymbol Printer" is catered to those with severe physical disabilities, such as cerebral palsy, as it provides a facile method of communication.  A user can simply point to various symbols on a page or board through the use of a special touch pad.  When the user chooses a symbol, the Blissymbol Printer converts the image to written English or French; allowing his or her thoughts to be transcribed effectively.  Her invention had begun as a project for a school science fair and she won the silver medal at the 1985 Canada-Wide Science Fair, showcased at the World Exhibition of Achievement of Young Inventors, she also won the YTV Achievement Award for Innovation.

Before the Blissymbol Printer was invented, it was a long and slow process since there must be an assistant watching people pointing to the symbols, and the people who cannot speak may also have poor motor control. With the Blissymbol Printer, everything is more convenient since the computer has infinite patience. Furthermore, the Blissymbol Printer made it more affordable to schools and families. The only software available for people who used Blissymbols before was on a system that cost around $10,000. However, the Blissymbol Printer Brachman designed only cost about $500, which is affordable for both school or home use.

Brachman has worked in various institutions, including the NASA Ames Research Center, the Canadian Space Agency, The Planetary Society and the California Institute of Technology. However, most of her works she has done has been with NASA. Since 2003, she works as an education and public outreach specialist with the Jet Propulsion Laboratory in Pasadena, California on projects such as Earth and exoplanet citizen science and international essay contests about moons of the outer solar system for students in fifth to twelfth grade. Her goal was to teach the public about space exploration. She also works for NASA Ames Research Center, focusing on combining space technology with assistive intelligence. Many of her works have been published in the Planetary Report, the Journal of the National Space Society, and the NASA's Ames Research Center Astrogram. Moreover, she does many works in education. For example, she led a teacher professional development workshops at both the National Science Teachers Association and the California Science Teachers Association annual conferences. She was also the president of Science Education for Students with Disabilities. More recently, she has been working on the Radioisotope power system public engagement and formal education for the Cassini-Huygens mission to Saturn and Titan.

Since 2003, Zimmerman has been employed as Solar System and Technology Education and Public Outreach Specialist at NASA's Jet Propulsion Laboratory. Using her connections made from the International Space University, Zimmerman is able to organize a Saturn essay contest for middle school and high school students in over 50 countries. Her work has been published in the Planetary Report, the Journal of the National Space Society and NASA's Ames Research Center Astrogram. Zimmerman is now currently working on Radioisotope Power System Public Engagement as well as formal education for the Cassini-Huygens Mission to Saturn and Titan.  Rachel leads teacher professional development workshops at National Science Teachers Association and California Science Teachers Association annual conferences. From 2013 to 2016, Rachel was president of Science Education for Students with Disabilities.

Her goal today is "trying to make sure the next generation, who loves space as much as I do, want to learn more about the missions that are going on right now."

Awards 
In 2011, Zimmerman received the Visionary Award of the Women in Film and Television Showcase at the Toronto International Film Festival.

References 

1972 births
Living people
Canadian inventors
Women space scientists
Women inventors
NASA people
Brandeis University alumni
International Space University alumni
California Institute of Technology faculty
People from London, Ontario
Scientists from Ontario
Scientists from California
Canadian space scientists
21st-century American inventors
21st-century American women scientists
21st-century Canadian scientists
21st-century Canadian women scientists